20th Nova Scotia general election may refer to:

Nova Scotia general election, 1855, the 20th general election to take place in the Colony of Nova Scotia, for the 20th General Assembly of Nova Scotia
1945 Nova Scotia general election, the 42nd overall general election for Nova Scotia, for the (due to a counting error in 1859) 43rd Legislative Assembly of Nova Scotia, but considered the 20th general election for the Canadian province of Nova Scotia.